The 2016 Cactus Bowl was a post-season American college football bowl game played on December 27, 2016 at Chase Field in Phoenix, Arizona. This was the twenty-eighth edition of the Cactus Bowl, which was previously known as the Copper Bowl, the Insight.com Bowl, the Insight Bowl, and the Buffalo Wild Wings Bowl.  Sponsored by the Motel 6 chain of budget motels, the game is officially known as the Motel 6 Cactus Bowl.

The bowl featured the Baylor Bears of the Big 12 Conference against the Boise State Broncos of the Mountain West Conference, and was the concluding game of the season for both teams.

Teams
The game features tie-ins from the Big 12 Conference and the Mountain West Conference.

Baylor Bears

Baylor opened the year 6–0 to become bowl eligible. They raised in the polls to as high as #8 in the AP poll and a tie for #6 in the coaches poll. However, the Bears would finish the season on a six-game losing streak to finish in the season 6–6. The team had to also deal all season with the ongoing Baylor University football scandal.

Boise State Broncos

Boise State opened the season 7–0 and climbed to #13 in the AP and coaches poll before losing to Wyoming and dropping in the polls. The Broncos won their next three games and rose back up to #19 in the polls and were in position to be the highest ranked team from the Group of 5 until a season ending loss to Air Force which dropped them out of the polls, the Mountain West Championship Game, and contention for the Group of 5 spot in a New Years Six bowl. They were selected for the Cactus Bowl after the Pac-12 Conference failed to have enough bowl eligible teams to fill their spot in the game and the Mountain West Conference received a backup spot.

Game summary

Scoring summary

Statistics

References

Cactus
Guaranteed Rate Bowl
2016 Cactus Bowl
2016 Cactus Bowl
December 2016 sports events in the United States
2016 in sports in Arizona
2010s in Phoenix, Arizona